The Principles of '98 refer to the American political position after 1798 that individual states could both judge the constitutionality of federal laws and decrees and refuse to enforce those that were deemed unconstitutional. That refusal is generally referred to as "nullification" but has also been expressed as "interposition:" the states' right to "interpose" between the federal government and the people of the state.

The Principles of '98 were widely promoted in Jeffersonian democracy, especially by the Quids, such as John Randolph of Roanoke, but never became law.

Etymology
The term derives from the Virginia and Kentucky Resolutions written in 1798 by James Madison and Thomas Jefferson, respectively. They led a vocal segment of the Founding Fathers that believed that if the federal government, if it is the exclusive judge of its limitations under the US Constitution, would eventually overcome those limits and become more and more powerful and authoritarian. It argued that despite formal limiting devices, such as elections and separation of power, would not suffice the government could judge its own case regarding constitutionality. As Jefferson wrote, "When all government, domestic and foreign, in little as in great things, shall be drawn to Washington as the center of all power, it will render powerless the checks provided of one government on another, and will become as venal and oppressive as the government from which we separated."

History
In contrast to their position, other Founding Fathers believed that it is the responsibility of the federal judiciary, not of the states, to determine whether Congress acts consistently with the Constitution. In Federalist No. 78, Alexander Hamilton stated that the federal courts are the natural and proper forum for determining such legal issues: "The interpretation of the laws is the proper and peculiar province of the courts. A constitution is, in fact, and must be regarded by the judges, as a fundamental law. It therefore belongs to them to ascertain its meaning, as well as the meaning of any particular act proceeding from the legislative body. If there should happen to be an irreconcilable variance between the two, that which has the superior obligation and validity ought, of course, to be preferred; or, in other words, the Constitution ought to be preferred to the statute, the intention of the people to the intention of their agents." In Federalist No. 80, Hamilton rejected the idea that each state may apply its own interpretation of the Constitution: "The mere necessity of uniformity in the interpretation of the national laws, decides the question. Thirteen independent courts of final jurisdiction over the same causes, arising upon the same laws, is a hydra in government, from which nothing but contradiction and confusion can proceed."

The Principles of '98 were not adopted by any other state. Seven state legislatures formally rejected the Kentucky and Virginia Resolutions, and three others expressed disapproval. Several of the states asserted that the federal judiciary, not the states, is the proper forum to interpret the Constitution.

In 1803, Marbury v. Madison was a case decided by the US Supreme Court that established the principle of judicial review, which has been the overriding legal precedent in constitutional law.

Nevertheless, versions of the Principles of '98 continued to be promoted by some parties during the early 19th century. Besides the original reaction to the Alien and Sedition Acts, the Virginia and Kentucky Resolutions, nullification was discussed and cited by state courts and legislatures in New England in reaction to the Embargo of 1807 and the War of 1812:

Similarly, the Massachusetts General Court approved  a committee report that stated: "Whenever the national compact is violated, and the citizens of this State are oppressed by cruel and unauthorized laws, this Legislature is bound to interpose its power, and wrest from the oppressor its victim."

South Carolina's opposition to the Tariff of Abominations was also based on the principles of '98, which led to the Nullification Crisis.

Another prominent use of the principles was in opposing the federal government's Fugitive Slave Laws, which forced people to aid and abet slavery, particularly the return of runaway slaves:

Part of that Wisconsin ruling was taken word for word from the Kentucky Resolutions of 1798. The US Supreme Court, however, overruled the Wisconsin Supreme Court in Ableman v. Booth (1859).

After the American Civil War, the Jeffersonians, who favored decentralized democracy and states' rights, permanently lost favor, and the Principles of '98 were largely forgotten. The US Supreme Court has remained both de facto and de jure the final arbiter of constitutionality in the United States.

Jefferson's biographer Dumas Malone argued that the Kentucky Resolution might have gotten Jefferson impeached for treason if his actions had become known at the time.  In writing the Kentucky Resolutions, Jefferson warned that "unless arrested at the threshold," the Alien and Sedition Acts would "necessarily drive these states into revolution and blood." The historian Ron Chernow stated that Jefferson "wasn't calling for peaceful protests or civil disobedience: he was calling for outright rebellion, if needed, against the federal government of which he was vice president." Jefferson "thus set forth a radical doctrine of states' rights that effectively undermined the constitution." Chernow argued that neither Jefferson nor Madison sensed that they had sponsored measures as inimical as the Alien and Sedition Acts themselves.

The historian Garry Wills argued, "Their nullification effort, if others had picked it up, would have been a greater threat to freedom than the misguided [alien and sedition] laws, which were soon rendered feckless by ridicule and electoral pressure." The theoretical damage of the Kentucky and Virginia Resolutions was "deep and lasting, and was a recipe for disunion." George Washington was so appalled by the resolutions that he told Patrick Henry that if "systematically and pertinaciously pursued," they would "dissolve the union or produce coercion..  The influence of the Jeffersonian doctrine of states' rights, however, reverberated right up to the Civil War. The future President James Garfield, at the close of the Civil War, said that the Kentucky Resolution "contained the germ of nullification and secession, and we are today reaping the fruits."

References

Further reading
 Gutzman, Kevin R. "A troublesome legacy: James Madison and `The principles of '98'," Journal of the Early Republic, Winter 1995, Vol. 15 Issue 4, pp 569–90

Classical liberalism
Libertarianism in the United States
Kentucky and Virginia Resolutions
Thomas Jefferson
United States constitutional law
Legal history of the United States